Chapman & Hall is an imprint owned by CRC Press, originally founded as a British publishing house in London in the first half of the 19th century by Edward Chapman and William Hall. Chapman & Hall were publishers for Charles Dickens (from 1840 until 1844 and again from 1858 until 1870), Thomas Carlyle, William Thackeray, Elizabeth Barrett Browning, Anthony Trollope, Eadweard Muybridge and Evelyn Waugh.

History
Upon Hall's death in 1847, Chapman's cousin Frederic Chapman began his progress through the ranks of the company and eventually becoming a partner in 1858 and sole proprietor on Edward Chapman's retirement from Chapman & Hall in 1866. In 1868 author Anthony Trollope bought a third of the company for his son, Henry Merivale Trollope. From 1902 to 1930 the company's managing director was Arthur Waugh.  In the 1930s the company merged with Methuen, a merger which, in 1955, participated in forming the Associated Book Publishers.  The latter was acquired by The Thomson Corporation in  1987.

Chapman & Hall was sold again in 1998 as part of Thomson Scientific and Professional to Wolters Kluwer, who sold on its well-regarded mathematics and statistics list to CRC Press.  Today the name of Chapman & Hall/CRC is used as an imprint for science and technology books by Taylor and Francis, part of the Informa group since 2004.

Most notably, the company were publishers for Charles Dickens (from 1840 until 1844 and again from 1858 until 1870), Thomas Carlyle, William Thackeray, Elizabeth Barrett Browning, Anthony Trollope, Eadweard Muybridge and Evelyn Waugh.  They continued to publish previously unpublished Dickens material well into the 20th century. Another popular author on the books in the 1880s was Henry Hawley Smart.

The firm kept an office at 186 Strand, and later at 193 Piccadilly and 11 Henrietta Street in Covent Garden.

Book series
 Chapman and Hall’s 2/- Net Library
 Fish and Fisheries Series
 The Foreign Library
 Library of Travel
 The Select Library of Fiction
 XVIII Century French Romances

Further reading

References

External links
 History of CRC Press

1834 establishments in the United Kingdom
Publishing companies of the United Kingdom
Publishing companies established in 1834